Big Baldy Mountain is the tallest mountain in the Little Belt Mountains located in Judith Basin County, Montana. The mountain is locally known as Mount Baldy.

History
Several people in the area around the mountain, including some scientists, believe that Big Baldy Mountain including nearby mountain ranges were formed from magma that never made it to the earth's surface several thousands of years ago. Even though evidence is slim at the summit of Big Baldy itself, satellite views of the mountain show noticeable craters and features that indicate possible volcanic activity. Many features such as craters, lakes at the summit of the mountain, and stains that look like an old lava trail or spill make the mountain look as if it were a volcano many years ago. It is believed that when the Rocky Mountains were forming from plate tectonics, the Little Belt Mountains underwent a period of being subjected to magma moving close to the surface in which created several intrusions on the surface. A theory suggests that a bulge of volcanic magma and gases began to raise the surface that is now Big Baldy Mountain. The magma never exactly reached the surface, but some volcanic gases did, which created the sunken craters on the mountain after the magma disappeared from below the surface. The bulge remained, creating Big Baldy Mountain, and due to the way it was created, no vegetation is present on the top of the mountain; which is possibly where the name of the mountain came from.

References

Mountains of Judith Basin County, Montana
Mountains of Montana